Sathankulam is a panchayat town in Thoothukudi district in the Indian state of Tamil Nadu.

Sathankulam town is located in the banks of the Karumeni river. It is well connected with Tirunelveli, Tuticorin, Nagercoil and Tiruchendur by road. Nearest airport is at Tuticorin airport , Thiruvananthapuram international airport  and Madurai international airport  from there from there.

History

Geography

Demographics
Total area of Sathankulam town is 5.2 km² . According to the census 2011 the town population is 22,205. population density is 4675/km². As per the Census of 2011, Sathankulam town had 65.16% Hindus, 32.01% Christians and 2.83% Muslims.

Administration
Sathankulam is a selection grade town panchayat it have 15 wards. Sathankulam is the one of the main taluks in Thoothukudi district. It was formed in 1983.Taluk head office is located at Nagercoil Main road, Sathankulam.

Transportation 
Sathankulam is situated in NH-93 which connects Nagercoil and Thiruchendur. There are also major roads which connect Sathankulam with Thirunelveli, Thisayanvilai, Nazareth and  Srivaikuntam.

Bus 
"K T Kosal Ram Bus Stand" is located in the north of the town. Frequent bus services are available to Tiruchendur, Tirunelveli, Thoothukkudi, Nagercoil and Valliyur from here. Also, buses to Uvari, Thisaiyanvilai, Madurai, Chennai, Coimbatore, Tirupur, Nazerth, Marthandam and kaliyakkavilai are available from here.

Agriculture
The major agriculture is Paddy in the Sattankulam Taluks. Groundnut cultivation also is undertaken in Sattankulam and near-by places. Groundnut cake is being used as manure and cattle feed. Palmyrah trees are grown mostly in Sattankulam and near-by villages. Sugarcane is also cultivated in some places. Palm Jaggery is produced from palmyrah juice; the production of Palm jaggery was the main occupation of the people of Sattankulam at one time.

Festivals
"Madha Ther Tiruvizha "is a very important ceremony that honors "Sri Puliyadi Mariamman Tiruvizha". A representation of him is pulled through the streets on a ther  by people that consider it an honor. Sri maha mariamman Tiruvizha very important

Politics
Sattankulam assembly constituency (no more & connected with Srivaikuntam Assembly Constituency) is part of Tiruchendur Lok Sabha constituency (no more & connected with Thoothukudi Lok Sabha constituency).

Notable people

 S. M. Abdul Jabbar, radio broadcaster, cricket commentator, writer, actor
N. Periasamy Former MLA of Tuticorin Constituency and Former DMK District Seceretry
S. P. Sarguna Pandian , Ex.Tamilnadu Minister, Ex.Deputy General secretary of DMK
Sasikala Pushpa , Former Tuticorin corporation Mayor , Former Rajya Sabha MP , Deputy State Leader of BJP Tamilnadu

See also
Periyathalai

References

External links
 Government of Tamil Nadu, Department of School Education, Tamil Nadu Schools

Cities and towns in Thoothukudi district